Camperdown is a town in southwestern Victoria, Australia,  west of the state capital, Melbourne. At the 2016 census, Camperdown had a population of 3,369.

History
The Djargurd Wurrung people were the traditional Aboriginal people of the Camperdown area, who had lived in the area for countless generations as a semi-nomadic hunter gatherer society. The first British settlers, the Manifold brothers (Thomas, John and Peter Manifold), arrived in the area from Van Diemen's Land (Tasmania) after 1835 to establish sheep and cattle runs.

Settlement was met with resistance by some of the local Aborigines, the Murdering Gully massacre taking place nearby. The area's history records instances of mutual assistance and friendship between native and settler people. Notable on this account is the family of David Fenton, the Scottish Presbyterian shepherd and drover who built the first house in Camperdown in 1853.

The original settlement was several miles to the north, near where the racecourse now is located. The settlement was called Timboon, but after a wet winter it was decided to move the town to higher ground nestled at the base of Mount Leura. With the relocation of the town, the local lake then known as Lake Timboon reverted to its indigenous name of Golongulac now known as Lake Colongulac.

The town was surveyed in 1851 and some of the founding fathers had Duncan as their Christian name. Wanting something more prestigious than Duncan as the town name it was decided to name the township Camperdown after most notable Duncan at the time, the Scottish naval hero Lord Viscount Adam Duncan the Earl of Camperdown. The first dwelling was erected on the site of the present Commercial Hotel in 1853 and the Post Office opened on 1 January 1854 replacing an earlier one in the area named Timboon.

In 1883 Wombeetch Puuyuun (also known as Camperdown George) died at the age of 43 and was buried in a bog outside the bounds of Camperdown Cemetery. His friend, James Dawson was shocked at this burial upon his return from a trip to Scotland, and personally reburied Wombeetch in Camperdown Cemetery. He appealed for money to raise a monument, but finding little public support, he primarily funded the monument himself. The 7 metre obelisk was erected as a memorial to Wombeetch Puuyuun and the Aborigines of the district, and has been described as being still inspiring today.

It became the service centre for the vast pastoral empires of the region. The Port Fairy railway line was opened in 1883, and the Timboon railway line was constructed in 1892.

By the mid 20th century Camperdown had emerged as a more diverse centre for dairy farming which drew on its rich volcanic soil, for woolgrowing and for produce processing industries. The Camperdown Magistrates' Court closed on 1 January 1990.

The town made the news in 1991 went an industrial dispute at the local abattoir. The dispute over pay and conditions occasionally turned violent between Police and picketers. The owner closed the site and the export licence transferred to another plant in Shepparton. 130 casual jobs were lost and many workers had to leave town in search for new employment.

More bad news for the town when the local milk factory relocated to a more modern plant in Cobden.

By the late 20th century the town had become a major centre for tourism because of its unspoiled 19th century architecture and as a gateway to the southern tourist attractions of the Otway Ranges, the Great Ocean Road and the 'Shipwreck Coast'.
In more recent years, however, the drought in Australia in the 21st has affected Camperdown's dairy industry.

Geography

Camperdown lies within the 'Lakes and Craters' region, sitting at the foot of Mount Leura which together with nearby Mount Sugarloaf are part of a large extinct volcanic complex known as the "Leura Maar". To the immediate west are the deep volcanic crater lakes Bullen-Merri and Gnotuk while to the east is the crater lake Purrumbete popular for its Trout and Chinook Salmon fishing.

It is the starting point of the Crater to Coast Rail Trail which, when completed, will reach Port Campbell. It currently terminates in Timboon.

Features
The town is renowned for its classic historical buildings.
Tower, avenue, Boer War memorial, Soldiers' memorial, memorial cross and JC Manifold statue are all listed on the Victorian Heritage Register.

Among the many other classic buildings are the 1886-7 two storey Georgian style Court House, the 1863 two storey bluestone (granite) Camperdown Post Office, Theatre Royal (1890) and Masonic Hall (1867–68).

The town has a life-sized statue of the Scottish poet Robert Burns, carved from sandstone in the 1830s and based on the earliest painting of the Bard. Efforts to restore the statue led to a festival celebrating the town's connection with Burns being held in 2012 and then annually.

Local government
Originally, Camperdown was part of the East Riding of the Shire of Hampden, which was incorporated in 1857. On 9 September 1952, Camperdown severed and incorporated as a separate borough. It became a town on 21 January 1959.  See Town of Camperdown.

On 23 September 1994, the Town was abolished, and merged with Shire of Hampden, most of Shire of Heytesbury and parts of Colac, Mortlake and the area around Princetown on the Great Ocean Road into the Shire of Corangamite.

The Town of Camperdown was not subdivided into wards, and the nine councillors represented the entire area.

Transport

Camperdown is situated on the Princes Highway (A1), which is the main through road and also the main street (Manifold Street). A dual carriageway with a large central reservation and secondary service street runs through the centre of town. The highway runs west to Terang and beyond to Warrnambool and east to Colac and beyond to Geelong.  Secondary roads include the Camperdown-Lismore Road which heads north to Lismore and the Camperdown-Cobden Road (C164) which heads south to Cobden.  Just west at Gnotuk is the Darlington Road (C173) which leads north to Darlington.

Road coaches (buses) provide links within Camperdown, to neighbouring towns and nearby cities (mainly V/Line) and these services include Cobden, Timboon, Simpson and the city of Ballarat.

The town's railway station is served by V/Line passenger services on the Warrnambool line linking it to the cities of Warrnambool, Geelong and beyond to Melbourne.

Community
The town has many sporting clubs. Archery, badminton, cricket, cycling, golf, horse riding, lawn bowls, squash and tennis, water skiing and yachting have competitions in and around the town.
The Camperdown community is heavily involved in competitive sport with the principal sport being Australian Rules Football. The town has a football team playing in the Hampden Football League.

Camperdown has a horse racing club, the Camperdown Turf Club, which holds one race meeting a year, the Camperdown Cup meeting in January. Camperdown is also home to the Lakes & Craters International Horse Trials, founded by Barry Roycroft in 1978.

Golfers play at the Camperdown Golf Club on Lake Bullen Merri Road.

There are also many groups providing arts and culture including the Camperdown Theatre Company, Lakes and Craters Band and Corangamite Arts.

Notable citizens
 Kevin Bradshaw - Represented Australia at the 1980 Moscow Olympics
 Grace Brown - cyclist for UCI Women's WorldTeam 
 Norm Sharp - Geelong Premiership player 1952
 James Chester Manifold - Politician elected at federation.
 Sir Chester Manifold - First Chairman TAB 1961–68
 Cameron Rahles-Rahbula - four-time Paralympian
 Paul Broderick - Fitzroy  and Richmond footballer
 Scott Lucas - Essendon premiership player 2000
 Ross Thornton - Fitzroy footballer
 Wayne Linton - Fitzroy footballer
 Adam Coote - AFL Boundary Umpire
 Len White - Geelong footballer
 Geoffrey Wickham AO - cardiac pacemaker pioneer
 Bill Roycroft - Olympian
 Sarah Wall - ANZ Championship Netball bench warmer, Melbourne Vixens (2009, 2011); Queensland Firebirds (2010)
 Brydon Coverdale - one of the "Chasers" on The Chase Australia
 Easton Wood - Australian rules footballer for Western Bulldogs (2008–Present)
 David Lake - Inaugural coach of Gold Coast Suns Women's side.
 Ken Hinkley - Senior coach of Port Adelaide Football Club
 Stewart McArthur - Federal member for Corangamite - 1984-2007
 Sam Walsh - Australian Rules footballer for Carlton Football Club

References

External links

Camperdown - Official state government tourism organization
Australian Places - Camperdown
Corangamite Shire (local government) - Camperdown

Towns in Victoria (Australia)
Shire of Corangamite
 
Western District (Victoria)